The Northern Junior Championship is a nationally ranked United States junior amateur golf tournament. The 36-hole stroke play event is contested over two days at Great River Golf Club in Milford, Connecticut and is open to amateur boys and girls under the age of 19 who have not entered their first year of college.

Past champions

2022 NaShawn Tyson / Joanne Lee
2021 Benjamin James / Jieming Yang
2020 Championship cancelled due to COVID-19
2019 Benjamin James / Emma Shen
2018 Benjamin James / Kyra Cox
2017 Mark Turner / Madeline Jin
2016 Bobby Weise / Virginia Ding
2015 Connor Daly / Alissa Yang
2014 Will Bernstein / Elizabeth Bose
2013 Evan Grenus / Amy Ding
2012 Will Essigs / Megan Khang
2011 Nick Fairweather / Nathalie Filler
2010 Andy Mai / Eliza Breed
2009 Michael Griffin / Katie Partridge
2008 Ryan Lee / Mia Landegren
2007 Ryan Lee / Elizabeth Monty
2006 Daniel Fanion / Megan Landry
2005 Cody Paladino / Lauren Cate
2004 Brent Paladino / Katie Grobsky
2003 Cody Paladino/ Natalie Sheary
2002 Steve Galotti / Juli Wightman

References

External links

Junior golf tournaments
Golf in Connecticut
Sports competitions in Connecticut